Events in the year 1789 in the Austrian Netherlands and Prince-bishopric of Liège (predecessor states of modern Belgium).

Incumbents

Habsburg Netherlands
Monarch – Joseph II

Governor General – Maria Christina of Austria-Lorraine with Albert Casimir of Saxony

Minister Plenipotentiary – Ferdinand von Trauttmansdorff

Prince-Bishopric of Liège
Prince-Bishop – César-Constantin-François de Hoensbroeck

Events
April
 29 April – Joseph II's government in Brussels issues a decree establishing rural representation in the Third Estate of the States of Brabant and abolishing their right to veto taxes.

May
 8 May – Council of Brabant refuses to register the decree abolishing the veto of the Third Estate in the States of Brabant.

June
 6 June – Joseph II instructs his minister in Brussels to decree that ordinary taxes will henceforth no longer be subject to annual approval by the States of Brabant.
 18 June – In a government coup, Ferdinand von Trauttmansdorff, Joseph II's minister in Brussels, decrees the abolition of the Council of Brabant, the States of Brabant, and the Joyous Entry.

August
 18 August – Beginning of Liège Revolution: democrats occupy the town hall
 26 August – César-Constantin-François de Hoensbroeck, prince-bishop of Liège, flees to Trier; Republic of Liège proclaimed.

September
 16 September – Déclaration des droits de l'homme et du citoyen de Franchimont: Declaration of Rights proclaimed at Franchimont Castle.

October
 24 October – Army of émigré volunteers invades the Austrian Netherlands; Manifesto of the People of Brabant read out in Hoogstraten.
 27 October – Battle of Turnhout (1789): government forces defeated by émigrés.

November
 Prussian forces sent to quell Liège revolution occupy the city of Liège.

December
 12 December – Government of Joseph II, headed by Ferdinand von Trauttmansdorff, evacuates Brussels; General Council of Government abolished.

Publications and performances
 André Grétry
 2 March – Raoul Barbe-bleue (opera), Paris, Comédie-Italienne
 17 March – Aspasie (opera), Paris, Opéra

Works of art

Births
May
 4 May – Alexandre Gendebien, government minister (died 1869)

April
 10 April – Princess Amélie Louise of Arenberg, noblewoman (died 1823)

October
 14 October – Constant van Crombrugghe, founder of the Josephites of Belgium (died 1865)

Deaths

References

1789 in the Habsburg monarchy
Austrian Netherlands
1789 in the Holy Roman Empire